Yester Parish Church is a church of the Church of Scotland in the village of Gifford, East Lothian, Scotland.  The village forms part of Yester, Bolton and Saltoun parish, and is a linked charge with Humbie Parish Church.

History and design 
Several church buildings have been used during the history of the parish. The earliest record of a church in the area (St Bathan's Chapel) is from 1241. Its ruins lie in the woods beside Yester House, to the south-west of the village centre. A church also once stood at Duncanlaw, a former settlement to the south-east of the main village.

The present building dates to 1708, and stands towards the north of the village, at the main road junction, just behind the village war memorial. The church is a Category A listed building.

Notable graves
Lord John Hay, Admiral of the Fleet (1827-1916) (memorial only)
William Hay, 10th Marquess of Tweeddale
David George Montagu Hay, 12th Marquess of Tweeddale

John Witherspoon 
Rev. John Witherspoon was born in Gifford manse in 1723, the son of Rev. James Alexander Witherspoon, the local minister. John Witherspoon emigrated and became a major leader of the Presbyterian Church in America. He was the only clergyman to sign the United States Declaration of Independence.

See also 
 Gifford
 Humbie Parish Church
 List of Church of Scotland parishes
 List of places in East Lothian

References 

 Yester Parish and Church - Leaflet for Visitors, Gifford, 2001

Churches in East Lothian
Church of Scotland churches in Scotland
Category A listed buildings in East Lothian
Listed churches in Scotland
Churches completed in 1708
1708 establishments in Scotland